Eucithara cinnamomea is a small sea snail, a marine gastropod mollusk in the family Mangeliidae.

Distribution
This marine species is found off the Strait of Malacca,  the Macassar Strait and Northern New Guinea.

Description
The length of the shell attains 13 mm.

The shell is shouldered, plicately ribbed, transversely obsoletely striated. It is cinnamon-colored, narrowly white-banded.

References

 Hinds, R.B. 1843. Description of new shells from the collection of Captain Belcher. Annals and Magazine of Natural History ser. 1 11: 16-21, 36-46, 255-257

External links
 Tucker, J.K. 2004 Catalog of recent and fossil turrids (Mollusca: Gastropoda). Zootaxa 682:1-1295
 

cinnamomea
Gastropods described in 1843